"Come Home with Me" is a song by Australian recording artist Guy Sebastian, released digitally in Australia on 8 August 2014. It debuted at number 13 on the ARIA Singles Chart and has been certified platinum. The video was released on August 12 via VEVO.

Release and promotion
Sebastian performed the song live on The X Factor Australia results show on August 11.

Track listing
Digital download
"Come Home with Me" – 3:24

CD single
"Come Home with Me" 
"Battle Scars" (acoustic)	
"Like a Drum" (Chainsmokers Remix)
catalogue:88875007392

Charts

Weekly charts

Year-end chart

Certifications

Release history

Awards
Australian Recording Industry Association Awards

|-
|2014
|"Come Home with Me"
|Best Male Artist
|
|-
|}

 * Note: The 2014 ARIA Award ceremony is due to take place on 26 November 2014. Final nominees were announced on 7 October.

References

2014 singles
2014 songs
Guy Sebastian songs
Sony Music Australia singles
Songs written by Guy Sebastian
Songs written by Britt Burton
Songs written by Mario Marchetti